Huang Lung-yi (born 20 June 1979) is a Taiwanese baseball player for the La New Bears. He played on the Chinese Taipei team at the 2006 World Baseball Classic.

References

1979 births
2006 World Baseball Classic players
First Financial Holdings Agan players
Fu Jen Catholic University alumni
La New Bears players
Living people